Allison Scott MacEachern (born 1960) is Vice Chancellor for Academic Affairs and a professor of archaeology and anthropology at Duke Kunshan University. Before joining the faculty of Duke Kunshan University in 2018, he was a professor of Anthropology at Bowdoin College for 23 years, where he also served as Chair of the Department of Sociology and Anthropology. An expert on African archaeology, he is the former president of the Society of Africanist Archaeologists. He was educated at the University of Prince Edward Island, where he received his Bachelor of Arts with honors in anthropology, and at the University of Calgary, where he received his M.A. and Ph.D. in archaeology.

References

External links

Living people
21st-century archaeologists
21st-century anthropologists
Bowdoin College faculty
Duke University faculty
Academic staff of Wuhan University
Canadian Africanists
University of Prince Edward Island alumni
University of Calgary alumni
Canadian anthropologists
Canadian archaeologists
1960 births